The Kent Derby is a greyhound racing competition held annually at Central Park Stadium. It was inaugurated in 2000.  The event is currently a category one race.

In 2022, the first prize was increased to £20,000 following sponsorship from Premier Greyhound Racing.

Past winners

Venues & Distances 
2000–present (Sittingbourne/Central Park 480m)

Sponsors
2015–2016 (John Smith's)
2017–2017 (Cearnsport)
2018–2020 (Ladbrokes)
2021–2021 (Arena Racing Company)
2022–2022 (Premier Greyhound Racing)

References

Greyhound racing competitions in the United Kingdom
Sport in Sittingbourne
Recurring sporting events established in 2000